Stephen Susa (born 12 May 1998) is a Sri Lankan cricketer. He made his Twenty20 debut on 14 January 2020, for Lankan Cricket Club in the 2019–20 SLC Twenty20 Tournament.

References

External links
 

1998 births
Living people
Sri Lankan cricketers
Lankan Cricket Club cricketers
Place of birth missing (living people)